Bizarro fiction is a contemporary literary genre which often uses elements of absurdism, satire, and the grotesque, along with pop-surrealism and genre fiction staples, in order to create subversive, weird, and entertaining works. The term was adopted in 2005 by the independent publishing companies Eraserhead Press, Raw Dog Screaming Press, and Afterbirth Books. Much of its community revolves around Eraserhead Press, which is based in Portland, Oregon, and has hosted the annual BizarroCon since 2008. The introduction to the first Bizarro Starter Kit describes Bizarro as "literature's equivalent to the cult section at the video store" and a genre that "strives not only to be strange, but fascinating, thought-provoking, and, above all, fun to read." According to Rose O'Keefe of Eraserhead Press: "Basically, if an audience enjoys a book or film primarily because of its weirdness, then it is Bizarro. Weirdness might not be the work's only appealing quality, but it is the major one."

In general, Bizarro has more in common with speculative fiction genres (such as science-fiction, fantasy, and horror) than with avant-garde movements (such as Dadaism and surrealism), which readers and critics often associate it with. While the genre may place an emphasis on the cult and outré, it is not without critical praise. Books by authors who have identified or have been identified as Bizarro have been praised by Lloyd Kaufman, Michael Moorcock and guardian.co.uk. Bizarro novels have been finalists for the Philip K. Dick Award, the Bram Stoker Award, and the Rhysling Award. A book of Bizarro criticism and theory was named Non-Fiction Book of the Year 2009 by 3:AM Magazine in Paris

Origins

Bizarro literature can trace its roots at least as far back as the foundation of Eraserhead Press in 1999, but the description of the literature as "Bizarro" is a more recent development. Previous terms used to refer to the burgeoning scene include "irreal" and "new absurdism", but neither of these was used broadly. On 19 June 2005, Kevin Dole II released "What The Fuck is This All About", a sort of manifesto for the then unnamed genre. While the essay does not feature the word "Bizarro," subsequent discussion about the essay led to the name as well as the inauguration of the Mondo Bizarro Forum.

In his essay, "The Nab Gets Posthumously Bizarroized", Tom Bradley traces the genre's roots back in literary history to the time of Vladimir Nabokov's "gogolization," and his cry of despair and horror at having his central nervous system colonized: "...after reading Gogol, one's eyes become gogolized. One is apt to see bits of his world in the most unexpected places." Bradley claims the Bizarro movement is continuing and fulfilling that gogolization process, under the name "Bizarroization": "...we have been completing the preposterous project which [Nabokov] took over from Gogol nearly a hundred years ago.." Bradley further asserts that Bizarro writers can trace their spiritual roots back to the letters which Ovid wrote while exiled on the Black Sea.

Response 

Author John Skipp and fellow small press author Eden Robins have written in praise of the do it yourself, self-promoting aesthetic. Thirdeye Magazine, an online zine, reinforces the perception of Bizarro writing as purposefully absurd. In the io9 article "Independent Publishers Who Are Reinventing The Future," co-editor Charlie Jane Anders praised Bizarro publisher Eraserhead Press as one of her favorite independent presses.

The British magazine Dazed & Confused stated that "The bastard sons of William Burroughs and Dr. Seuss, the underground lit cult of the Bizarros are picking up where the cyberpunks left off."

Wonderland Book Award 
The Wonderland Book Award honors the best in bizarro fiction each year. The award recognizes two categories: best novel/novella and best short story collection. The award is voted on by bizarro authors and fans, and presented in the fall at BizarroCon.

Best Short Story Collection 
2021: Don't Push the Button - John Skipp

2020: Don't F[Bleep]k with the Coloureds - Andre Duza 

2019: To Wallow in Ash & Other Sorrows - Sam Richard

2018: Nightmares in Ecstasy - Brendan Vidito

2017: Angel Meat - Laura Lee Bahr

2016: Berzerkoids – Emma Alice Johnson

2015: The Pulse Between Dimensions and the Desert – Rios de la Luz

2014: I'll Fuck Anything that Moves and Stephen Hawking – Violet LeVoit

2013: Time Pimp – Garrett Cook

2012: All-Monster Action – Cody Goodfellow

2011: We Live Inside You – Jeremy Robert Johnson

2010: Lost in Cat Brain Land – Cameron Pierce

2009: Silent Weapons for Quiet Wars – Cody Goodfellow

2008: Rampaging Fuckers of Everything on the Crazy Shitting Planet of the Vomit Atmosphere – Mykle Hansen

2007: 13 Thorns – Gina Ranalli

Best Novel/Novella 
2021: Jurassichrist - Michael Allen Rose

2020: The Loop - Jeremy Robert Johnson

2019: Unamerica - Cody Goodfellow

2018: Coyote Songs - Gabino Iglesias

2017: Sip - Brian Allen Carr

2016: I Will Rot Without You – Danger Slater

2015: Skullcrack City – Jeremy Robert Johnson

2014: Dungeons & Drag Queens – Emma Alice Johnson

2013: Motherfucking Sharks – Brian Allen Carr

2012: Space Walrus – Kevin L. Donihe

2011: Haunt – Laura Lee Bahr

2010: By the Time We Leave Here, We'll Be Friends – J. David Osborne

2009: Warrior Wolf Women of the Wasteland – Carlton Mellick III

2008: House of Houses – Kevin L. Donihe

2007: Dr. Identity – D. Harlan Wilson

Notable Bizarro Works 
Most notable Bizarro works generally tend to come from the major Bizarro presses, most notably Eraserhead Press. Although there are many books that have qualities of Bizarro, such as William Burroughs' Naked Lunch or Mark Z Danielewski's House of Leaves, a Bizarro work tends to be defined by its publication inside of the Bizarro scene, from between the years 2001, when the first Carlton Mellick III book was published, to the present.

Although Bizarro is a DIY genre that gets little media attention, a notable Bizarro work is often one that has broken past the barriers of the genre and received wider attention in literature and media.

Authors

Querus Abuttu
Andrew Wayne Adams
David Agranoff
Kirsten Alene Pierce
Forrest Armstrong
Michael A. Arnezn
Ben Arzate
Brian Auspice
Steve Aylett
Laura Lee Bahr
David W. Barbee
Duncan B. Barlow
Maxwell Bauman
William Bevill
Amanda Billings
Vincenzo Bilof
Lori Bowen
Christopher Boyle
Tom Bradley
Dave Brockie
G Arthur Brown
Jeff Burk
Justin A. Burnett
Hugo Camacho Cabeza
Leza Canotral
Lance Carbuncle
Brian Allen Carr
Nathan Carson
Shane T. Cartledge
Adam Cesar
Autumn Christian
Michael Cisco
Alan M. Clark
Scott Cole
Edmund Colell
John Wayne Comunale
Garrett Cook
Jase Daniels
Nicholas Day
Rios de la Luz
Robert Devereaux
Jaime Dunkle
Andre Duza
Russel Edson
Brian Evenson
Amber Fallon
Karl Fischer
Ben Fitts
Constance Ann Fitzgerald
Andy de Fonseca
Chris Genoa
Eckhard Gerdes
Garvan Giltinan
Larissa Glasser
J. F. Gonzalez
Matthew T. Granberry
Devora Gray
Gerri R. Gray
Jamie Grefe
Michael Griffin
Justin Grimbol
Nikki Guerlain
Douglas Hackle
Mykle Hansen
Eric Hendrixson
C.V. Hunt
Gabino Iglesias
Emma Alice Johnson
Jeremy Robert Johnson
Kirk Jones
Stephen Graham Jones
Michael Kazepis
David James Keaton
Mike Kleine
John Edward Lawson
Michael Sean LeSueur
Edward Lee
Christopher Lesko
Marc Levinthal
D. F. Lewis
Kelby Losack
Steve Lowe
Tom Lucas
Nick Mamatas
Spike Marlowe
Eric Mays
Shane McKenzie
Chris Meekings
Carlton Mellick III
Adam Millard
Brent Millis
Jonathan Moon
Christine Morgan
Charles Austin Muir
Kyle Muntz
Nisio Isin
Don F. Noble
Jeff O'Brien
J David Osborne
Riley Michael Parker
Christoph Paul
William Pauley III
Cameron Pierce
Sam Pink
Pedro Proença
Andersen Prunty
Katy Michelle Quinn
Steven Rage
Liv Rainey-Smith
Gina Ranalli
Tony Rauch
Dustin Reade
Matthew Revert
Sam Richard
Jason Rizos
Jennifer Robin
Tamara Romero
Michael Allen Rose
Kris Saknussemm
Bradley Sands
Tiffany Scandal
Michael J. Seidlinger
Kevin Shamel
Jeremy C. Shipp
John Shirley
Bix Skahill
John Skipp
Danger Slater
Bryan Smith
Andrew James Stone
Alyssa Sturgill
Madeleine Swann
Kevin Sweeney
Molly Tanzer
Bruce Taylor
Anthony Trevino
Violet LeVoit
Brendan Vidito
Daniel Vlasaty
Grant Wamack
J.W. Wargo
Patrick Wensink
Wrath James White
Lee Widener
Caleb Wilson
D. Harlan Wilson
Jason Wuchenich

See also

 Absurdist fiction
 Horror comedy
 Ero Guro
 New Weird
 List of genres

References

External links
Bizarro Central

Fiction by genre
Literary movements
Literary genres
Underground culture
2000s neologisms
2005 neologisms